The Kilbeck Hills are a low mountain range in the eastern Mojave Desert, in San Bernardino County, southern California.

References 

Mountain ranges of the Mojave Desert
Mountain ranges of Southern California
Mountain ranges of San Bernardino County, California
Bureau of Land Management areas in California